Yevhen Santrapynskykh (born 21 October 1987) is a professional Ukrainian football midfielder.

Career
Yevhen Santrapynskykh is a product of Bastion Illichivsk school system, in Odessa Oblast. He made his debut for the Metalurh Zaporizhzhia senior team on 10 June 2007, during the  Ukrainian Premier League home match against rival FC Kharkiv, which Metalurh club won 3:1.

External links
 Profile on Football Squads
 Profile at Official Site FFU (Ukr)
 

1987 births
Living people
People from Chornomorsk
Ukrainian footballers
Association football midfielders
Ukrainian Premier League players
Ukrainian expatriate footballers
Expatriate footballers in Belarus
FC Metalurh Zaporizhzhia players
FC Metalurh-2 Zaporizhzhia players
FC Bastion Illichivsk players
FC Bukovyna Chernivtsi players
SC Tavriya Simferopol players
FC Naftan Novopolotsk players
FC Stal Kamianske players
FC Hirnyk Kryvyi Rih players
MFC Mykolaiv players
PFC Sumy players
Sportspeople from Odesa Oblast
21st-century Ukrainian people